Kharp is an urban locality (an urban-type settlement) in Priuralsky District of Yamalo-Nenets Autonomous Okrug, Russia, located on the bank of the Sob River near the Polar Urals. Population:

References

Urban-type settlements in Yamalo-Nenets Autonomous Okrug